A shtick is a comic theme or gimmick. The word entered the English language from the Yiddish shtik (שטיק), related to German Stück and Polish sztuka (all ultimately from Proto-Germanic *stukkiją), all meaning "piece", "thing" or "theatre play"; "Theaterstück" is the German word for play (and is a synonym of "Schauspiel", literally "viewing play" in contrast to the "Singspiel").

The English word "piece" is sometimes used in a similar context (for example, a musical piece).
In stand-up comedy context a near equivalent term is a "bit". Another variant is "bits of business" or just "bits". Shtick may refer to an adopted persona, usually for comedy performances, that is maintained consistently (though not necessarily exclusively) across the performer's career. In this usage, the recurring personalities adopted by Laurel and Hardy through all of their many comedy films (although they often played characters with different names and occupations) would qualify as their shtick. A comedian might maintain several different shticks of this sort, particularly if appearing in a variety show encouraging development of multiple characters, such as Saturday Night Live.

In common usage, the word shtick has also come to mean any talent, style, habit, or other eccentricity for which a person is particularly well-known, even if not intended for comedic purposes. For example, a person who is known locally for an ability to eat dozens of hot dogs quickly might say that it was his shtick. Among Orthodox Jews, "shtick" can also refer to wedding shtick, in which wedding guests entertain the bride and groom through dancing, costumes, juggling, and silliness.

Many fictional characters have more thematic shticks. This is particularly true of comic book villains, who are almost always seen wearing a particular costume and behaving in ways that are consistent with a bizarre and psychotic obsession. The supervillains of Batman (collectively known as the Rogues Gallery) are especially notorious for this (see below). There are also many professional wrestlers who deliver memorable catchphrases, and/or enter arenas performing signature gestures to the tune of thematically appropriate songs, causing crowds to laugh and cheer (see below).

Because of its roots in show business, shtick has taken on the connotation of a contrived and often used act. For this reason, journalists and commentators often apply the word disparagingly to stock replies from politicians.

Notable examples
Charlie Chaplin created one of the earliest of modern comedy shticks: bowler hat, toothbrush mustache, bamboo cane, baggy pants, floppy shoes, and a waddling walk.
Buster Keaton sported a robotic, never-changing facial expression.
Harold Lloyd wore thick glasses and a boater hat.
Marcel Marceau, the archetypal mime artist, was famous for "Bip": a white-faced clown in a top hat and sailor suit. His act included pretending to walk against a stiff wind and behaving as if he were enclosed by walls.
Lucille Ball's shtick included imitating a baby's cry and wrinkling up her face. More elaborate routines included getting drunk while advertising a vitamin syrup and gobbling chocolates while working on the assembly line at a candy factory.
Jack Benny's character on his radio program was notoriously both stingy and a bad violin player, as well as being perpetually 39 years old.  In real life, Benny was known as a competent violinist and lavish tipper, and kept celebrating his 39th birthday each year publicly because "there's nothing funny about 40".
Bill Cosby became famous for delivering satirical monologues (often about his humble upbringing) and complaining about the younger generation in an exasperated drawl.
Three of the Marx Brothers, Groucho, Chico and Harpo, had well-honed shticks by the time they started making movies.
Groucho, with his stooped walk, greasepaint moustache, lascivious eyebrow raising, and his cigar;
Chico, with his fake Italian accent, his "shooting the keys" style of piano playing, and borderline moronic behavior; and
Harpo, with his pantomime routines, the seemingly bottomless pockets of his trench coat, and his ability to play the harp.
 The fourth performing brother, Zeppo, never developed a shtick and was a straight man in their movies — though some have argued that blandness and "normality" was indeed his shtick.
W.C. Fields nurtured a character that was not far from himself in real life, being misanthropic, misogynistic, and a hard drinker, as well as the unique bellow of his voice and his famous bulbous nose.
Many of the performers over the course of Saturday Night Live'''s long broadcast history have developed shticks that were popular enough to be developed into feature films. The earliest of these was The Blues Brothers, the dark-suited alter egos of Dan Aykroyd and John Belushi, which spawned two movies and several actual blues albums. Of the movies that followed in later years, some met with similar success (such as Mike Myers' Wayne's World), while others are regarded as critical and commercial disasters (Julia Sweeney's It's Pat!).
Henny Youngman's standard line "Take my wife — please!" was part of his shtick. It consisted of several one-liners delivered in rapid-fire sequence.
Johnny Carson's many shticks include his role as "Carnac the Magnificent", an Indian fortune teller who could divine answers to questions sealed in envelopes and "kept in a hermetically sealed mayonnaise jar on the front porch of Funk & Wagnalls since noon today". His signature imaginary golf swing at the end of his monologue would also qualify.
Chris Berman's shtick in his ESPN commentary was his tendency to give additional nicknames to players based on their last names (often intended as puns or pop culture references). Berman was also known to often say a football player "could — go — all — the — way" on long touchdown plays (parodying Howard Cosell's delivery).
Comedian George Carlin created a famously banned shtick, "Filthy Words", a/k/a "Seven dirty words."
Andrew Dice Clay's shtick in his comedy routines is his crude, misogynist themed humor, and sometimes vulgar reinterpretations of nursery rhymes.
Rodney Dangerfield's shtick was centered around his famous catchphrase, "I don't get no respect," accompanied by his characteristic facial gesture and yanking or straightening his scarlet necktie.
Stephen Colbert has referred to his character from his show The Colbert Report as a shtick.
Andy Kaufman was a particularly rigorous practitioner of shtick. Kaufman almost never appeared in public, other than as one of his shtick characters, such as "Foreign Man" or Tony Clifton. When he did appear as himself, he still acted out some shtick routine, with one notable example being a long-running professional wrestling feud with Jerry Lawler.
The Rubberbandits are Irish comedians who wear plastic bags over their faces as shtick.
Yakov Smirnoff's shtick, at the height of his career, involved comparisons between the United States and the Soviet Union, punctuated by the catchphrase "What a country!".
Lewis Black's shtick is the crescendo of rage upon which his routines are built; another is bewailing the rise in his blood pressure due to the presumed strain of these outbursts.
Sam Kinison's shtick was his increasingly emotional, high-stress vocal delivery, often leading to actual shouting or screaming, to the point where his voice became hoarse.
Bob Newhart's shtick is his long phone calls with imaginary or historical persons. Hearing only Newhart's deadpan comments, the audience is left to infer what the other person is saying.
All original members of The Wiggles were known for having shticks. Jeff Fatt's was falling asleep at odd times, leading the other Wiggles and the audience to call out the catchphrase "Wake Up Jeff!", Anthony Field's was eating too much food, Greg Page's was doing magic tricks, and Murray Cook's was an obsession with playing the guitar.
Penn and Teller's shtick focuses mainly on which part of the duo does the talking; Penn provides the only on-stage narration and is the only public voice of the act, whereas Teller never speaks on stage or on camera. In on-camera interviews, Teller remains in shadow, and in rare circumstances when Teller speaks on-stage, his face is obscured.
Gilbert Gottfried's stage persona, with his perpetually high-pitched squeaky voice and pinched face, is a shtick that has been maintained through almost all of his public appearances and television and film roles.
Larry the Cable Guy's stage persona, developed during his days as a member of a morning radio zoo crew, is considered a shtick. Despite his public appearances as a hillbilly with a deep Southern accent, propensity for wearing sleeveless flannel shirts and his signature "Git-R-Done!" catchphrase, the comedian, whose real name is Daniel Whitney, is a native of Nebraska.
Jerry Lewis played a nerd character with a nasal voice and overexcited mannerisms.
Flip Wilson had as his catchphrase "The devil made me do it!"
Pee-wee Herman is recognizable for his tight-fitting gray suit, red bow tie, short black hair, pale face, and rouged cheeks. He also delivers a high-pitched laugh, and is often seen riding a colorful bicycle. His trademark comeback is "I know you are, but what am I?"
Adam Sandler once performed the shtick of playing simple ditties on his guitar (most famously his "Hanukkah" song) while awkwardly singing lyrics in a whiny voice.
Chris Farley was a large, heavyset, clumsy man, with a loud and sometimes wheezy voice. His most famous sketch character, Matt Foley, would warn other characters to behave, lest they wind up "living in a van down by the river," before falling and crashing into something.
Julie Brown was known for her stereotypical "dumb blonde" character, and her lisp.
Jaleel White was known as Steve Urkel, a nerdy boy who wore glasses and suspenders, played the accordion, and delivered a snorting laugh. His most noteworthy shtick was accidentally destroying something and then asking guiltily, "Did I do that?"

Batman villain examples
The Joker (real name unknown): This psychopathic killer naturally resembles a clown, wears a purple suit, and commits crimes that often reference humorous entertainments, such as the circus, vaudeville, stand-up comedy, or cartoons. His partner Harley Quinn performs a similar, though often feminized, shtick.
Catwoman (real name Selina Kyle): A beautiful cat burglar who imitates an actual cat with her claws, pointed-eared mask, and skintight bodysuit.
The Penguin (real name Oswald Cobblepot): Has a fascination with birds, and penguins in particular. Also wears a tuxedo and top hat, and uses an umbrella for various purposes.
Two-Face (real name Harvey Dent): Half his face is hideously scarred, and he is obsessed with the duality of human nature. His morality is determined by the flip of a coin that has scratch marks carved into one side.
The Riddler (real name Edward Nigma; sometimes Nashton): Leaves clues to his criminal capers in the form of riddles.
The Mad Hatter (real name Jervis Tetch): Commits crimes thematically based either on hats or on the children's story Alice in Wonderland.
Mr. Freeze (real name Victor Fries): A metahuman who can survive only in a cybernetic suit that keeps his body at subzero temperatures. Uses an ice-spraying gun as his weapon.
Poison Ivy (real name Pamela Isley): A fanatical botanist, she considers plants to be more worthy of life than humans. Dresses in foliage and commits crimes with the help of mutated, often carnivorous plants. She can kill a victim with the toxins in her body via a kiss. Harley Quinn is her sidekick and lover, despite the differences between their shticks.
The Scarecrow (real name Jonathan Crane): Dresses as his namesake. Infects his victims with a hallucinogenic gas that causes them to see their worst fears come to life.
Bane (real name Eduardo Dorrance): He was a former prisoner subjected to a dangerous medical experiment that gave him superior physical strength and near-invulnerability. Usually seen wearing a frightening hooded mask, to which is attached an implant that pumps Venom, a powerful steroid, directly into his bloodstream.
Ra's Al-Ghul: He is a wealthy Middle Eastern lord whose facial hair gives him the appearance of a devil. He is centuries old due to regular immersions in the rejuvenating chemicals of the Lazarus Pit. A genocidal lunatic, his objective is to destroy everything in the world he considers evil.
The Ventriloquist (real name Arnold Wesker): He is skilled at throwing his voice, and expresses an alternate personality through Scarface, a wooden dummy dressed as a gangster.
Maxie Zeus (real name Max Zlotski): Believes himself to be the Greek god of thunder, and usually seen wearing a toga and sandals.
Clayface (real name Matt Hagen): A former actor whose body chemistry was mutated by a putty-like substance, he is able to reshape his body into the form of any human he wishes, as well as being able to mimic his or her voice.
Killer Croc (real name Waylon Jones): Suffers from a disease that has left him with scaly green skin, and believes himself to be an actual crocodile.
The Firefly (real name Garfield Lynns): An arsonist armed with a flamethrower, dressed in metal armor that makes him resemble a humanoid insect.
Abbatoir (real name Arnold Etchison): This cannibalistic serial killer slaughtered and ate members of his family, believing that their "souls" would keep him alive indefinitely. He was one of the few Batman'' villains who was killed and stayed dead.
Baby Doll (real name Mary Dahl): Born with a chronic condition that left her with the physical proportions of a toddler, she believes herself to be literally a toddler, albeit an evil one.
Roxy Rocket (real name Roxanne Sutton): Dresses as a World War I fighter pilot and rides a missile-shaped aircraft.
Hush (real name Thomas Elliot): This villain worked behind the scenes, secretly manipulating other villains. His face was always swathed in bandages. He was fond of quoting the philosopher Aristotle.
Deadshot (real name Floyd Lawton): Known as the world's greatest sharpshooter and assassin-for-hire.
Black Mask (real name Roman Sionis): This mob boss has a mania for masks, and conceals his burned face with one that is black and terrifying. His minions, collectively known as the False Face society, also wear masks.
Victor Zsasz: A knife-wielding murderer who usually appears stripped to the waist or almost naked, displaying the tally marks carved into his skin for every victim whose throat he has slit.
The Phantasm (real name Andrea Beaumont): An assassin who dresses in a futuristic suit that makes her resemble the Grim Reaper.
Cap'n Fear: Looks, talks, and acts like a colonial-era pirate captain.
The Ratcatcher (real name Otis Flannegan): A former exterminator, he instead came to see himself as the leader of all sewer rats. He summons the rats by blowing into a "silent" whistle.
Azrael (real name Jean-Paul Valley): More of an antihero than a villain, Azrael wore the disguise of a murderous knight with a fiery sword. The Azrael persona was passed down from father to son for several centuries.
Mr. Nice: This mild-mannered, bespectacled man stages violent robberies, but also attempts to be polite and even kind to his victims.
The General (real name Ulysses Armstrong): A child prodigy obsessed with military history.
The Troika: Three ex-Soviet spies (Dark Rider, Romana, Colonel Vega) turned terrorists, they continued to operate after Russia's communist government fell. They were assisted by the KGBeast, a hulking cyborg.
The Condiment King (real name Buddy Standler): One of the most humorous (and harmless) members of the Rogues Gallery. All he was capable of doing was squirting messy condiments at people. He was revealed to be a stand-up comedian whom the Joker, in a fit of jealousy, drove insane using a mind chip.

Professional wrestling shticks
"Gorgeous George" Wagner developed one of the earliest wrestling gimmicks: that of an effeminate wrestler with curled blond hair, who had a phobia of germs and would be accompanied to the ring by a servant spraying antiseptic perfume.
"Nature Boy" Buddy Rogers was one of the first "arrogant heel" characters. He was known for saying, "To a nicer guy, it couldn't happen."
Hulk Hogan: Known for flexing his biceps while flashing a wild-eyed expression. Told children to "eat their vitamins and say their prayers."
Ric Flair sported an elaborate robe and long blond hair, and delivered numerous catchphrases, such as "Woo!" and "To be the man, you gotta beat the man." During his matches he would sometimes "strut," walking in an exaggeratedly slow manner while pointing his index fingers.
Sting: He enters rings dressed all in black and with his face painted white and black, often with a baseball bat. He also howls while cupping his hands around his mouth.
CM Punk: Performs a gesture very similar to Sting's, except that he shouts, "IT'S CLOBBERIN' TIME!"
Stone Cold Steve Austin: His main shtick is crashing two opened beer cans together before gulping down both of them at once. His most common catchphrase is "Gimme a 'Hell yeah!' "
Triple H: Upon reaching the ring, he would take a sip from a water bottle and then spew the water straight up into the air. At special events, he was known to enter arenas wearing a metal crown and often a matching skull mask, in tribute to his "King of Kings" nickname.
Shawn Michaels: Known for a variety of distinctive gestures: throwing his head back and spreading his arms out as pyrotechnics explode in the background; squatting sideways on his haunches while flexing his biceps; dramatically springing to his feet after being knocked down; tumbling ostentatiously over ring turnbuckles when he is thrown into them; and stomping his foot repeatedly before kicking an opponent in the face.
The Undertaker: Believing himself to be undead, he walked toward the ring through bluish mist at a foreboding tread, wearing a black hat and trench coat. Another signature gimmick of his was crossing his eyes and sticking out his tongue as he "killed" (pinned) an opponent.
Kane: Supposedly pyrokinetic, he would angrily lift his hands above his head before bringing them down with a violent motion, apparently causing the turnbuckles to burst into flame.
John Cena: Among the gestures he performed were the "Five-Knuckle Shuffle" (bouncing off the ropes before falling to the mat with a palm strike to the face of a downed opponent) and the "You Can't See Me" (waving his hand in front of his face). His greatest catchphrase was "The champ is here!" Earlier in his career, he taunted his opponents with insulting rap lyrics.
Batista would crouch on the entrance ramp and "fire" imaginary machine guns with his fists as smoke bombs went off behind him, then stand up and thrust his palm down in tandem with a final explosion. During matches he was known to experience a rush of adrenaline that inspired him to grab the ring ropes and shake them furiously while "roaring."
Randy Orton stands atop the turnbuckle while posing narcissistically, one hand raised higher than the other.
Kurt Angle, a real-life Olympic gold medalist, wore his medal around his neck constantly. The words he lived by were "intensity," "integrity," and "intelligence." His catchphrase was "Oh, it's true. It's damn true."
 "Mr. Anderson," born Ken Anderson: A loudmouth known for performing his own ring introduction, loudly intoning his last name twice. 
Bobby Roode: At certain times in his career, he has worn a fancy bathrobe and not only bragged about being selfish, but claiming to lead the "Selfish Generation." Also has nicknamed himself "Glorious."
James Storm: A Southern redneck. Catchphrase: "Sorry about your damn luck."
Maxwell Jacob Friedman (MJF) is a New York City socialite with some Mob characteristics, famous for sporting an oversized diamond ring and a plaid scarf worn around his shoulders. Uses his fortune to hire goons and to bribe others into giving him what he wants. Claims to be "better than you, and you know it."
Tojo Yamamoto (real name Harold Watanabe, who was Japanese-American) played to American awareness of the Pacific Theater of World War II. Tojo was a Japanese general, and Yamamoto was the Japanese admiral who oversaw the attack on Pearl Harbor. Tojo Yamamoto wore a kimono to the ring, and often would use wooden shoes to strike opponents.

See also
 Trope

References

Comedy
Yiddish words and phrases
Jewish comedy and humor